Lionel Harbin (3 October 1976) is an Australian former professional rugby league footballer who played in the 2000s, and has coached in the 2010s.

He was a highly rated , however he made only one appearance for the Wakefield Trinity Wildcats in 2001's Super League VI against Huddersfield Giants due to re-occurring injuries.

In the 2010s, Harbin became heavily involved with Rockhampton-based QRL club the Central Queensland Capras as both a player and a coach. Harbin stepped in as an interim head coach of the team following the sudden resignation of Jason Hetherington two months into the 2015 season.

In 2021, he was named as head coach for the Capras to take over from Guy Williams for the 2022 season. As head coach, Harbin successfully led the Capras to the 2022 finals series, the first time the team had reached the finals since 2009 when they were known as the Central Comets.

References

External links
Lionel Harbin to Coach CQ NRL Bid U/13s Junior Development Team

1976 births
Living people
Australian rugby league coaches
Australian rugby league players
Place of birth missing (living people)
Rugby league hookers
Wakefield Trinity players
Vanuatu national rugby league team coaches